Gastón Rodrigo Losa (born August 20, 1977) is an Argentinian retired football goalkeeper

Career

Losa played three years in Chile for Deportes La Serena.

References

External links
BDFA profile

Living people
1977 births
Argentine footballers
Argentine expatriate footballers
CSyD Tristán Suárez footballers
Deportivo Español footballers
Deportes La Serena footballers
Club Atlético Temperley footballers
Club Atlético Los Andes footballers
Gimnasia y Esgrima de Mendoza footballers
Independiente Rivadavia footballers
Club Almirante Brown footballers
Ferro Carril Oeste footballers
All Boys footballers
Primera Nacional players
Primera B Metropolitana players
Chilean Primera División players
Torneo Argentino A players
Argentine expatriate sportspeople in Chile
Expatriate footballers in Chile
Association football goalkeepers
Footballers from La Plata